The Freedom Book is an album by American jazz saxophonist Booker Ervin featuring performances recorded in 1963 for the Prestige label.

Reception
The Allmusic review by Steve Leggett awarded the album 4½ stars and stated "The Freedom Book is a near perfect set of modern hard bop, ranging just far enough out there to feel fresh but retaining a strong lifeline to bop tradition".

Track listing
All compositions by Booker Ervin except where noted
 "A Lunar Tune" - 7:50
 "Cry Me Not" (Randy Weston) - 4:53
 "Grant's Stand" - 8:01
 "A Day to Mourn" - 9:33
 "Al's In" - 9:48

Personnel
Booker Ervin - tenor saxophone
Jaki Byard - piano
Richard Davis - bass
Alan Dawson - drums

References

Prestige Records albums
Booker Ervin albums
1964 albums
Albums recorded at Van Gelder Studio
Albums produced by Don Schlitten